William Boddie Jr. (born June 12, 1977) is an American politician from the state of Georgia. A member of the Democratic Party, Boddie has represented the 62nd district in the Georgia House of Representatives since 2017. He served as House Minority Whip from 2019 to 2021.

Boddie ran for House Minority Leader in 2020, losing to Rep. James Beverly.

References

1977 births
21st-century American politicians
Living people
Democratic Party members of the Georgia House of Representatives